Namakama is a small town and seat of the commune of Balan Bakama in the Cercle of Kangaba in the Koulikoro Region of south-western Mali.

References

Populated places in Koulikoro Region